Alliluyev (masculine) or Alliluyeva (feminine) is a Russian surname. Notable people with the surname include:

Joseph Alliluyev (1945–2008), Russian cardiologist
Nadezhda Alliluyeva (1901–1932), wife of Joseph Stalin
Svetlana Alliluyeva (1926–2011),  daughter Joseph Stalin and Soviet defector

Russian-language surnames